Golden Rock (Ponmalai) is one of the four zones of Tiruchirappalli. The railway colony and railway workshop are nearby

Demographics 
The majority of the area is occupied by  Golden Rock Railway Workshop and its residential colonies for its employees.

Neighbourhoods 

Its neighborhoods are Kalkandar Kottai, Keezhakkurichy, Nathamaadipatti, Ponmalaipatti, Kottapattu, Subramaniyapuram, Sangiliandapuram, Senthaneerpuram, Ambikapuram, Thangeswari Nagar, Ex-servicemen colony. Most of the civilians of golden rock are S.Rly employees. It is well known for its shandy (market) held every Sunday, which was established during British rule in 1926.

Transport 

Healthcare 
It has one of the city's oldest hospital belonging to Indian Railways, Divisional Railway Hospital.

See also 
 Battle of Golden Rock
 Central Workshops
 Railway Mixed Higher Secondary School

References

Neighbourhoods and suburbs of Tiruchirappalli